Apfel (German for "apple") is a surname. Notable people with the surname include:

 Arthur Apfel (1922–2017), British figure skater
 Holger Apfel (born 1970), leader of the National Democratic Party of Germany (NPD) in Saxony
 Howard Apfel, (born 1962) American Rabbi and Cardiologist
 Iris Apfel (born 1921), American businesswoman, former interior designer, and fashion icon
 Kenneth S. Apfel (born 1948), 13th Commissioner of Social Security in the United States
 Oscar Apfel (1878–1938), American film actor, film director, screenwriter and film producer

See also 
 Front Deutscher Äpfel, organisation founded in Leipzig in 2004 that satirizes right extremist parties, especially the Nationaldemokratische Partei Deutschlands (NPD)
 Eastern Enterprises v. Apfel, United States Supreme Court case

 German-language surnames